The Maiden England World Tour was a concert tour by Iron Maiden, which began on 21 June 2012 in Charlotte, North Carolina and ended on 5 July 2014 with a performance at the Sonisphere Festival at Knebworth, UK. The tour's setlist was largely based on the original 1989 concert video of the same name, shot during the Seventh Tour of a Seventh Tour in 1988, which was re-released in 2013. Because of this, the tour's setlist consisted almost entirely of the band's 1980s material, with a particular focus on their 1988 album, Seventh Son of a Seventh Son. The stage show was also based on the original tour and featured numerous pyrotechnic effects in addition to multiple appearances by the band's mascot, Eddie. Following 2005's Eddie Rips Up the World Tour and 2008–2009's Somewhere Back in Time World Tour, this was the group's third and final tour inspired by a particular period of their history.

The opening section of the world tour took place in North America from June to August 2012. With 34 dates in its opening leg, this was Iron Maiden's most extensive tour of North America in over 12 years and was subject to critical and commercial success. In 2013, the band continued the tour with worldwide dates, encompassing Europe and North and South America, before concluding in 2014 with a final European leg. Over three years, 100 shows were undertaken in 32 countries before an estimated audience of over 2,5 million people. Throughout the tour, consistent praise was received from music critics, with the band's performances and the stage show receiving particular acclaim. From the 58 performances tallied by Billboard magazine, the group grossed US$69,243,543 in box office revenue.

The tour featured a number of notable performances from the band, with the South American leg including their third show at the Rock in Rio festival in Brazil and their first concert in Paraguay. During their 2013 European leg, they became the first rock group to confirm an appearance at Stockholm's national stadium, Friends Arena, which sold out in record-setting time. In addition, Iron Maiden returned to Download Festival for their record-breaking fifth headline concert at Donington Park, 25 years after their first show at the venue during 1988's Seventh Tour of a Seventh Tour. To mark the occasion, the band's set began with a Spitfire flyover, an event which was mirrored at the tour's final concert at Knebworth, which was preceded by a First World War air display, organised and featuring vocalist Bruce Dickinson.

Background
The tour was officially announced with a press release on 15 February 2012, which stated that the shows would be based around the 1989 video of the same name, which bassist Steve Harris later reported would be re-released in the first half of 2013. On 12 February 2013, the band announced that the original concert footage would be released on DVD, CD and LP under the title Maiden England '88 on 25 March. It was Iron Maiden's third concert tour to take a retrospective look at a particular period in the group's history, following 2005's Eddie Rips Up the World Tour and 2008–2009's Somewhere Back in Time World Tour, with Dickinson confirming that it would be the band's last to do so in December 2013.

In addition to the 29 dates included in the tour's first press release, the band went on to announce festival appearances at Milwaukee's Summerfest, Cadott's Rock Fest, and Ottawa Bluesfest, as well as a concert in Sacramento, California, and an extra night in Irvine, California. With 34 dates in its first leg, this was the band's most extensive North American tour in over a decade. In their list of the Top 200 North American Tours of 2012, Pollstar revealed that, from 30 shows, Iron Maiden sold 285,866 tickets and grossed US$16.1 million.

Following the 2012 tour of the United States and Canada, the tour continued with worldwide shows in 2013, as confirmed in the band's initial announcement. Speaking to Kerrang! in August 2012, Steve Harris confirmed that the band still intended to extend the tour into 2013, during which they will "be doing European festivals and all kinds of other stuff." On 20 September, the band disclosed that they would be performing at Download Festival on 15 June 2013, marking their record-breaking fifth headline appearance at Donington Park 25 years after their first concert at the venue which they headlined in 1988 where Monsters of Rock was originally held. To commemorate this, their show began with a flypast by a Spitfire TE311 from the Battle of Britain Memorial Flight aerial display group, which is based at RAF Coningsby.

On 25 September, Iron Maiden became the first rock band to confirm a performance at Stockholm's national stadium, Friends Arena. The concert sold out in record-breaking time, with Wales Online reporting that 50,000 tickets were sold in 49 minutes. Following the performance in Stockholm, Aftonbladet reported that hundreds of fans were demanding their money back, citing poor sound quality during the concert. After a complaint was filed with the Swedish National Board for Consumer Complaints, Live Nation, the concert's promoter, conducted an investigation and decided not to offer a refund, arguing that "sound experience during a concert is [a] subjective judgement". A local sound engineer, Linnéa Carell, commented that Friends Arena is extremely unsuitable for concerts, as the stadium's design causes the sound to echo badly.

From October 2012 to March 2013, the band revealed dates in Paris, Germany, Malmö, Sweden, Amsterdam, Zurich, Poland, Russia, Lisbon, Helsinki, Prague, Zagreb, Bilbao, Bucharest, and Istanbul. During the group's appearance at Donington, Dickinson announced that the 2013 European leg would conclude with a concert in London, although an additional performance was confirmed after the initial show sold out in 12 minutes. As previously stated by Harris, the band also headlined several European festivals, with appearances made at Graspop Metal Meeting in Dessel, Belgium, Seerock festival in Graz, Austria, Topfest in Piešťany, Slovakia, and  Sonisphere Festival shows in Amnéville, France, Milan, Madrid and Barcelona.

On 16 October 2012, Iron Maiden revealed that, following the 2013 European leg, they would take the Maiden England World Tour to South America with a performance at the Rock in Rio festival in Rio de Janeiro, Brazil. Further South American dates in Buenos Aires, Santiago, São Paulo, Curitiba and Asunción, which marked their debut appearance in Paraguay, were announced in April. The São Paulo show, originally slated to take place at the Jockey Club, had to be moved to Anhembi Arena due to sound restrictions at the original venue. In April, the band also announced that, prior to the South American leg, they would play seven US shows, which included headlining a special event at San Bernardino, entitled "The Battle of San Bernardino", which was immediately followed by a concert in Mexico City. Santiago, the final date of the 2013 tour, reportedly attracted 60,105 fans, which local newspaper La Tercera cited as "the largest audience by a British band ever [in Chile]". Overall, the group played 46 concerts in 2013 to an estimated attendance of 1.2 million. In their list of the Top 100 worldwide tours of 2013, Pollstar revealed that, from 34 of their shows that year, the band sold 705,250 tickets and grossed US$46.8 million.

On 2 December 2013, Iron Maiden announced that the tour would finish with a number of European shows in the summer of 2014, encompassing previously confirmed dates at the Rock am Ring and Rock im Park festivals in Germany, with the final concert taking place at Sonisphere Knebworth on 5 July. This was followed throughout December 2013 by the disclosure of a number of festival dates, including Hellfest in Clisson, France, Greenfield Festival in Interlaken, Switzerland, Nova Rock Festival in Nickelsdorf, Austria, FortaRock Festival in Nijmegen, Netherlands, Bråvalla Festival in Norrköping, Sweden, Copenhell in Copenhagen, Denmark, Rock in Idro in Bologna, Italy, and Main Square Festival in Arras, France. Throughout February and March 2014, the band announced arena shows in Sofia, Bulgaria, Budapest, Hungary, Brno, Czech Republic Esch-sur-Alzette, Luxembourg, Poznań, Poland, Belgrade, Serbia, Barcelona and Bilbao, Spain, and an appearance at the Bergen Calling festival in Norway. On 4 March, the group's Luxembourg concert was moved to Herchesfeld, the Rock-A-Field Festival Ground, in Roeser, after tickets at the initial venue sold out in less than two hours. On 29 May, it was announced that a portion of the revenue from the band's Belgrade concert would be donated to the relief effort following the 2014 Southeast Europe floods. Following the Spitfire flypast which preceded their performance at Download festival the previous year, Dickinson, piloting a Fokker Dr.I, joined the Great War Display Team in a "dogfight tribute" in honour of the First World War's 100th anniversary, which took place above the Sonisphere Knebworth site prior to Iron Maiden's appearance at the festival. Overall, the tour saw the band perform 100 shows in 32 countries, with a reported attendance of over 2 million people.

Production

Song selection and rehearsal
In the original press release announcing the tour, Bruce Dickinson confirmed that the band intended to perform "about two thirds of the original track list of Maiden England" along with "other favourites". When asked why the band had chosen to focus on this specific period, guitarist Adrian Smith explained that they "thought it'd be fun to revisit that period in time... It's just great revisiting some of the songs we haven't played for a long while. It keeps us fresh", while Steve Harris stated that "We just felt like that's what we wanted to do. We do what we think is right and that's it. We'll never put a census out." Drummer Nicko McBrain explained that "After [2010's] The Final Frontier, we took a backseat to recording records and asked what can we do on tour. We put our heads together and thought of the [1988] Seventh Son [of a Seventh Son] album. It's a great album and a lot of kids into the band haven't seen some of these songs live. So it was decided that we revisit that." Although the setlist consisted entirely of songs released at least 20 years earlier, Smith affirms that "We've never been a nostalgia band. It's a way for the fans to hear the songs again. I don't see anything wrong with that."

According to Harris, the band were certain of "around 75 percent" of the tour's setlist before they began rehearsing, during which they "got a better feel for which ones would really work well live". In regards to some tracks that were not included in the Maiden England video but which the band had decided to play anyway, Smith explained that including "Phantom of the Opera" (from 1980's Iron Maiden) was someone else's suggestion and "actually fits in great", while, speaking about material from 1992's Fear of the Dark, he stated that "Afraid to Shoot Strangers" offered "a nice contrast to what else is going on" while "Fear of the Dark" "has become quite a cornerstone of the set."

Smith stated that relearning "Seventh Son of a Seventh Son" (from the 1988 album of the same name) "was a bit of a handful ... the more we rehearsed it the more the little bits that were sticking needed work. It took quite a bit of work to get it right; it's more of a piece of music rather than a song", while rehearsing "The Prisoner" (from 1982's The Number of the Beast) and "The Clairvoyant" (from Seventh Son of a Seventh Son) was "pretty straightforward." McBrain reports that the band spent "a couple days' rehearsal" going over regularly played tracks, while other songs, such as "Seventh Son of a Seventh Son" and "Afraid to Shoot Strangers", which had not been performed for some time, required going over "with a fine-tooth comb." McBrain also stated that, in order to relearn certain pieces, he watched the Maiden England video again and came to realise that they could not perform those songs "at that speed today and make it work", as they have become "more refined with where we go with the tempos now." "Infinite Dreams" was rehearsed but was replaced by "Afraid to Shoot Strangers" according to the Iron Maiden Fan Club site where several members ran into manager Rod Smallwood after the second show in Atlanta and questioned the set list. It was claimed Rod stated that "the band weren't really feeling it and decided to go with something different."

Set list
In addition to Dickinson's statement that the band would play "about two thirds" of the Maiden England track list, several other songs in the band's setlist were revealed prior to the tour's commencement. During an interview with Rockline on 11 June 2012, guitarists Adrian Smith and Dave Murray announced that they would play "Seventh Son of a Seventh Son" and "The Prisoner", while Smith stated on an episode of That Metal Show that they would "probably play most of" the Seventh Son of a Seventh Son album. An interview with Adrian Smith published by The Aquarian Weekly on 20 June confirmed that the band would also perform "Can I Play with Madness" (from Seventh Son of a Seventh Son) and "Aces High" (from 1984's Powerslave).

Harris highlighted "The Prisoner" and "Seventh Son of a Seventh Son" as his favourite songs to play from the tour as "they're such epic songs and we haven't played them live for so long", while Smith stated that "the atmosphere ["Seventh Son of a Seventh Son"] creates live is really cool. It's great to be playing that one again." In addition, Harris emphasised "fan favourites" such as "Run to the Hills", "The Number of the Beast" (both from The Number of the Beast) and "Can I Play with Madness" "as the crowd reaction is so intense. It's electrifying."

Overall, this was the first Iron Maiden tour since 1991, 1998 and 1988 in which "The Prisoner", "Afraid to Shoot Strangers" and "Seventh Son of a Seventh Son" were played respectively. It was also notable for being the band's first tour in which "Hallowed Be Thy Name" (from The Number of the Beast) was not played since its release. Throughout the tour, Nick Ingman and Terry Devine-King's "Rising Mercury" served as the intro music. As with all past performances of the song, "Aces High" was preceded by Winston Churchill's We shall fight on the beaches speech, although this was the first time that the song wasn't played as a show opener.

In the press release announcing the tour's 2014 European leg, Dickinson revealed that the band would alter the setlist to be more representative of the group's entire 1980's output. "Afraid to Shoot Strangers", "The Clairvoyant" and "Running Free" (from 1980's Iron Maiden) were replaced by "Revelations" (from 1983's Piece of Mind), "Wrathchild" (from 1981's Killers) and "Sanctuary" (from Iron Maiden) respectively.

Stage set

As confirmed in the tour's press release, the band's stage set was decorated in an Arctic-style similar to the original Seventh Tour of a Seventh Tour. As usual, the group used a wraparound stage with platforms and podiums for vocalist Bruce Dickinson to use, this time decorated with frozen pictures of the band's mascot Eddie. After its absence during The Final Frontier World Tour 2010–11, the band returned to using pyrotechnics. Dickinson explained in 2011 that "we like to alternate it every other year, because if you get the reputation that you've got to go and see a band because of the pyro and then you don't do the pyro, people think, 'Oh, I won't bother then.'"

Three additional Eddies made appearances throughout the show: a 15-foot walking General Custer during "Run to the Hills", a scribe (based on artwork from the Seventh Son of a Seventh Son album's inner sleeve) during the song "Seventh Son of a Seventh Son" (although unable to appear at some concerts in the US due to space limitations) and finally an Eddie based on the Seventh Son of a Seventh Son cover art during "Iron Maiden", which featured flames emerging from its head. On top of this, a goat/devil statue appeared during "The Number of the Beast" and Michael Kenney, the band's backstage keyboard player, surfaced during "Seventh Son of a Seventh Son" wearing a mask and cape as he did on the Seventh Tour of a Seventh Tour.

Steve Harris stated that the band had "been working on this stage production for a very long time", and decided to use "the same people who created the original Maiden England production for us [in 1988]." He went on to explain that "We wanted to keep the same theme but, wherever possible, to surpass the production of that tour – given the technology on offer today. And I think we've achieved that, especially with our light show, all the pyro and, of course, Eddie!" According to the Sarnia Observer, the band "brought 22 tractor trailers and buses full of equipment for the show" while Sarnia Bayfest organiser Michele Stokley stated that it was the largest production the festival had ever hosted, even bigger than Kiss'. Cadott's Rock Fest had to expand their stage in order to fit the band's production, with festival organiser Wade Asher also recognising it as "the biggest set we've ever had".

Reception
The tour received critical acclaim, with Loudwire labelling it as "not an event to be missed". Creative Loafing Charlotte stated that the group's opening performance proved "Iron Maiden as a whole is back and in fine metal form", while Revolver were also extremely positive in their review of the Newark show, saying that "while fans can always expect an energetic, acrobatic set from the English metal legends, it's impressive that the group is able to put on a show that so perfectly recalled the things that made them special in the first place." CTV News described the concert in Vancouver as "ferocious, timeless and just a little bit daft", concluding that "Iron Maiden [were] utterly entertaining from start to finish", while The Salt Lake Tribune reported that "the band surprised and delighted with a near flawless performance" in West Valley City, deeming that "it was a night to remember." Metal Hammer awarded the band full marks for their performance in Toronto, remarking that it was "a night of flawless, breathtaking victory" before concluding that "tonight is made in Heaven."

The band's individual performances were also applauded, with the Calgary Sun deeming the group "relentless" and the Calgary Herald commenting that "these veterans [still] possess some ferocious chops". Loudwire stated that the group gave "the performance of a lifetime from the very first note of 'Moonchild'", while the Los Angeles Times described the music as "tight, precise and flawless." Lead singer Bruce Dickinson received particular acclaim, with Creative Loafing Charlotte saying his voice was "in perfect shape – maybe even showing more power than heard on albums", while NUVO argued that he "out-sang, out-performed and out-swaggered any other vocalist out there", and The Dallas Morning News remarked that he "looks and sounds remarkably youthful ... his robust wail of a voice didn't miss a beat". The Edmonton Journal described him as "a whirl of pure energy, impressive at age 53", while CTV News stated that he was "an over-animated ball of theatrical energy", and that he gave "a front man master-class."

Praise was also awarded for the tour's setlist, which CTV News reported as "an all killer, minimal filler set list for the ages...a less than gentle stroll down memory lane", while Kerrang! considered it "possibly their mostly deliriously direct set list ever", consisting of "hit after hit after hit." The Edmonton Journal described it as "every Maiden song you would ever wish for," while Loudwire stated that "this may very well be the last time you have the chance to hear some of Maiden's greatest works live." The Calgary Herald, although deeming it "a night of nostalgia", commented that it was "a collection of songs that have aged surprisingly well in a genre that often doesn't." Creative Loafing Charlotte argued that "Iron Maiden isn't on a nostalgia trip this time around. They're putting everything they've got into the music" and "it's difficult to fathom that any fans left the show disappointed". In contrast to this, the absence of "Infinite Dreams" (from Seventh Son of a Seventh Son, 1988) was criticised by Rolling Stone Spain and Le Journal du Dimanche, while Metro Winnipeg described the inclusion of "Afraid to Shoot Strangers" as "a weird time to pull out a deep cut", although they went on to state that the "momentum wasn't lost for long".

While the Calgary Sun stated that "the music is never outdone by the spectacle", the stage show was also well received, with Creative Loafing Charlotte deeming it "a feast for the eyes and ears". The Calgary Herald commented that "Maiden pulled out all the stops for the faithful", while the Edmonton Journal argued that "you can't be bored at an Iron Maiden concert, even if you happen to not like the music — which you should", elaborating that this is because "there's just far too much going on, with the ever-changing backdrops, pyrotechnics and rampaging demons."

Opening acts

2012
Alice Cooper on all dates from 21 June to 21 July.
Coheed and Cambria on all dates from 24 July to 18 August.

2013
Voodoo Six in Bilbao, Lisbon, Paris, Frankfurt, Berlin, Hamburg, Zurich, Amsterdam, Singen-Aach, Łódź, Gdańsk, Oberhausen, Malmö, Stockholm, Bucharest, Istanbul, Prague, Zagreb, and London (3 August).
Ghost in Singen-Aach, Oberhausen, Helsinki, Mexico City, São Paulo, Curitiba, Buenos Aires, Asunción, and Santiago.
Sabaton in Singen-Aach, Oberhausen, Malmö, Stockholm, Saint Petersburg, Moscow, and Helsinki.
Amorphis in Helsinki.
Anthrax in Bucharest, Istanbul, and Zagreb.
Zico Chain in London (4 August).
Megadeth in the United States.
Slayer in Mexico City, São Paulo, Curitiba, Buenos Aires, Asunción, and Santiago.

2014
Anthrax in Barcelona, Bilbao, and Budapest.
Ghost in Brno, Sofia, Belgrade, Poznań, and Roeser.
Slayer in Poznań.

Tour dates

Festival performances

This concert was a part of "Summerfest"
This concert was a part of "Ottawa Bluesfest"
This concert was a part of "Sarnia Bayfest"
This concert was a part of "Rock Fest"
This concert was a part of "Sonisphere Festival"
This concert was a part of "Download Festival"
This concert was a part of "Seerock Festival"
This concert was a part of "Topfest"
This concert was a part of "Graspop Metal Meeting"
This concert was a part of "The Battle of San Bernardino"
This concert was a part of "Rock in Rio"
This concert was a part of "FortaRock Festival"
This concert was a part of "Rock in Idro"
This concert was a part of "Rock am Ring and Rock im Park"
This concert was a part of "Copenhell"
This concert was a part of "Greenfield Festival"
This concert was a part of "Nova Rock Festival"
This concert was a part of "Hellfest"
This concert was a part of "Bråvalla Festival"
This concert was a part of "Bergen Calling"
This concert was a part of "Main Square Festival"

Box office score data

Notes
Figures represent two performances at the same venue

Personnel

(Credits taken from the official tour programme.)
Iron Maiden
 Bruce Dickinson – lead vocals
 Dave Murray – guitar
 Adrian Smith – guitar, backing vocals
 Janick Gers – guitar
 Steve Harris – bass guitar, backing vocals
 Nicko McBrain – drums, percussion
Management
Rod Smallwood
Andy Taylor
Booking Agents
Rick Roskin at CAA (North America)
John Jackson at K2 Agency Ltd. (Rest of the World)

Crew
Dickie Bell – production consultant
Ian Day – tour director
John "Collie" Collins – tour manager
Patrick Ledwith – production manager
Rik Benbow – stage manager
Zeb Minto – production coordinator
Kerry Harris – production assistant
Martin Walker – front of house sound engineer
Rob Coleman – lighting designer
Michael Mule – monitor engineer
Antti Saari – lighting chief
Sean Brady – Adrian Smith's guitar technician
Michael Kenney – bass guitar technician and keyboards
Charlie Charlesworth – drum technician
Justin Garrick – Janick Gers' guitar technician
Colin Price – Dave Murray's guitar technician
Ian 'Squid' Walsh – sound technician
Mike Hackman – sound system technician
Ashley Groom – set carpenter
Philip Stewart – set carpenter
Jude Aflalo – set carpenter
Eoin McBrien – set carpenter
Jeffrey Weir – head of security
Natasha De Sampayo – wardrobe
Andy Matthews – video director
Nicholas Birtwistle – video technician
Peter Lokrantz – masseuse/security
Ian "Evo" Evans – merchandising
Todd Nakamine – tour press coordinator
Howard Johnson – tour press coordinator

References

External links
 Official Iron Maiden website
 Maiden England North American Tour Dates (2012)
 Maiden England World Tour Dates (2013)
 Maiden England Tour Dates (2014)

2012 concert tours
2013 concert tours
2014 concert tours
Iron Maiden concert tours